Trebor is a brand of confectionery, originally a British company.

History
Trebor was founded on 4 January 1907 in south west Essex by W.B. Woodcock, Thomas Henry King, Robert Robertson, and Sydney Herbert Marks from Leytonstone and was located on Katherine Road (at Shaftesbury Road) in Forest Gate, London E7. The name Trebor, which is “Robert” spelled backwards, was registered as a trademark four days after the end of World War I. On 18 April 1944, the factory in Katherine Road was hit by a German bomb. It bought Moffat toffee in 1959, and Jamesons Chocolates in 1960.

By the end of the 1960s, the company was exporting to over fifty countries; 20% of its output from its three factories was exported. The largest export market was the United States. Up to 1966, it had doubled its exports in four years. In the 1967 Birthday Honours, the Chairman John Marks (son of the founder, and who died in December 1980) was appointed a CBE for the company's exports; he was president from 1956 to 1959 of the Cocoa, Chocolate and Confectionery Alliance.

By the end of the 1960s, it was the fourth largest confectionery manufacturing group in the United Kingdom; its main competitors were Rowntree Mackintosh Confectionery and Cadbury. Early advertising used the jingle, "Trebor mints are a minty bit stronger".

In January 1969, it bought the confectionery interests of Clarnico. In 1970, John Graham Marks (29 September 1930 – 31 October 2012), the grandson of the company's founder, became chairman of the company, and owned the company with his brother Ian; the company was family run and also had a Christian paternalistic ethos. In 1981, the company discontinued night shifts, as it believed that night shifts were possibly damaging to family life.

In December 1985, it bought Maynards for £7.5m. In the middle of the 1980s, the company was the British market leader in branded mints and boiled sweets.

Acquisition by Cadbury
On Thursday 14 September 1989, Cadbury Schweppes bought the company for £147m. The company was run as a subsidiary company of Cadbury. At the time, the company employed around 3,000.

From 1 March 1990, the company was known as Trebor Bassett, a division of Cadbury. Production would eventually move to North Sheffield, off the A61.

Structure

The company was headquartered in what was south-west Essex, in Woodford, Greater London. It initially had a factory at Forest Gate called the Trebor Works from 1935 between Upton Park tube station and East Ham tube station in what is now the London Borough of Newham, north of the former ground of West Ham United F.C. and west of Plashet.

Its main headquarters were at Clayhall, next to the southern terminus (Junction 4 or Woodford Interchange) of the M11 on the Southend Road Industrial Estate on the A1400 (former A406 or North Circular Road).

In 1939, a factory on a five-acre site was opened on Brimington Road in Chesterfield, on the site of a former brewery next to Chesterfield railway station; the factory in Chesterfield closed in 2005. The Trebor Bassett national distribution centre was off the A6175 in Holmewood, North East Derbyshire, off the M1 Heath Interchange; this is now the NDC of Tangerine Confectionery.

In 1978, a £15m factory was opened in Colchester, which eventually closed in March 2000.

Awards
In April 1966, Trebor won the Queen's Award to Industry.

Products
 Refreshers, launched in 1935
 Extra Strong Mints, known as Extra Strong Peppermints when launched in 1937
 SoftMints, peppermint or spearmint flavours
 SoftFruits, orange, lemon and strawberry flavours

See also
 CAOBISCO

References

External links
 Britain from Above in 1950
 Trebor Story

British companies established in 1907
Chesterfield, Derbyshire
Confectionery companies of the United Kingdom
Economy of Derbyshire
Manufacturing companies based in Sheffield
Food and drink companies established in 1907
Forest Gate
History of the London Borough of Newham
History of the London Borough of Redbridge
Cadbury